Pedro Ferrer may refer to:
 Pedro Ferrer (footballer) (1908–?), Cuban footballer
 Pedro Ferrer (athlete) (born 1954), Puerto Rican sprinter
 Pedro Ferrer (baseball) (1903–?), Cuban second baseman